Eugonatonotus crassus is a species of crustacean first described by Alphonse Milne-Edwards in 1881.

References

Caridea
Crustaceans described in 1881